Sindelbach is a river of Baden-Württemberg, Germany. It flows into the Jagst near Krautheim.

See also
List of rivers of Baden-Württemberg

References

Rivers of Baden-Württemberg
Rivers of Germany